The Beaver Dam Wash National Conservation Area is a  United States National Conservation Area located in southwest Utah west of St. George along the borders with Arizona and Nevada. It is managed by the U.S. Bureau of Land Management as part of the National Landscape Conservation System, and was authorized in the Omnibus Public Land Management Act of 2009.

The Beaver Dam Wash National Conservation Area (NCA) is drained by Beaver Dam Wash in the watershed of the Virgin River, a tributary of the Colorado River. The NCA provides habitat for the desert tortoise, bighorn sheep, Joshua trees, and other threatened and sensitive species.

Gallery

References

National Conservation Areas of the United States
Bureau of Land Management areas in Utah
Protected areas of Washington County, Utah
Protected areas established in 2009
Units of the National Landscape Conservation System